The Montreal International Documentary Festival is a Canadian documentary film festival, staged annually in Montreal, Quebec.

In English, the festival now goes by the name Montreal International Documentary Festival, while retaining the French-language abbreviation RIDM).

History 
The RIDM was founded in 1998 by documentary filmmakers who wanted to create a platform for new perspectives and innovative practices in documentary film. The program, organized around social, political and environmental themes, features distinctive films chosen for their unique perspective and artistic strengths. Workshops and panel discussions welcome audiences, professionals and partners alike.

Forum RIDM 
Formerly known as “Doc Circuit Montréal”, the RIDM is also home to "Forum RIDM" Quebec's foremost documentary marketplace, established in 2004, to support and stimulate independent documentary production in Quebec and to bring filmmakers, craftspeople, producers, distributors and programmers of every kind together.

Award winners

14th edition (2011)

15th edition (2012)

16th edition (2013)

17th edition (2014)

18th edition (2015)

19th edition (2016)

20th edition (2017)

21st edition (2018)

22nd edition (2019)

23rd edition (2020)

24th edition (2021)

25th edition (2022)

References

External links
RIDM Official website
Film festivals in Montreal
Film festivals established in 1998
Documentary film festivals in Canada
1998 establishments in Quebec
Canadian documentary film awards